The 1981 South African Grand Prix was a Formula Libre motor race held on 7 February 1981 at Kyalami.

The race was originally scheduled to be the opening round of the 1981 FIA Formula One World Championship. However, the ongoing war between Fédération Internationale du Sport Automobile (FISA) and the Formula One Constructors' Association (FOCA) resulted in FISA insisting on a date change which was not acceptable to the race organisers. Approval was ultimately given for the race to go ahead on its original date, but as a Formula Libre race rather than as a round of the Formula One World Championship. The downgraded race was supported by the teams affiliated with FOCA, but not by the manufacturer teams (Alfa Romeo, Ferrari, Ligier, Osella and Renault), all of whom were aligned with FISA. (Toleman was experiencing troubles with its overweight car and would not debut until the San Marino Grand Prix). The eleven teams present all fielded cars fitted with sliding side skirts, aerodynamic devices which were illegal in Formula One for 1981 but acceptable under Formula Libre regulations. The absence of the manufacturer teams meant that all 19 cars in the race were powered by Ford Cosworth engines.

The race was eventually won by Carlos Reutemann, driving a Williams, with Nelson Piquet second in a Brabham and Elio de Angelis third in a Lotus.

Classification

Qualifying

Race

References

1981 SA Grand Prix Dieter Rencken RacingLines https://www.racefans.net/2019/01/23/wpdc-the-breakaway-threat-which-set-the-template-for-modern-f1/

External links

South African Grand Prix
South African Grand Prix
Grand Prix
February 1981 sports events in Africa